Jan Nicklasson (born 19 April 1954) is a Swedish rower. He competed in the men's coxless four event at the 1980 Summer Olympics.

References

1954 births
Living people
Swedish male rowers
Olympic rowers of Sweden
Rowers at the 1980 Summer Olympics
Sportspeople from Gothenburg